Sevan Bıçakçı (born 1972) is a famed Turkish jeweller of Armenian descent. He is one of the few renowned jewelers in Turkey and is known around the world. He is considered a "star jeweler" in Turkey.

Life and career 
Of Armenian descent, Sevan Bıçakçı was born in 1972 in the Samatya district of Istanbul, Turkey. He is known as the 'King of Rings'. At the age of 12, his father, who was a theater actor, placed Sevan under the apprenticeship of Hovsep Catak in the Grand Bazaar of Istanbul. After serving 4 years of apprenticeship, his master died. However, he had learned a great deal about jewellery design and craftsmanship. He then opened a workshop in order to serve bigger manufacturers as a freelance jewel designer. He worked on his first collection for a year before unveiling it in the global market in 2002. His jewelry designs are that of Byzantine and Ottoman styles. Some of Sevan Bıçakçı's famous clientele include Catherine Zeta-Jones, Elizabeth Hurley, Celine Dion, Liv Tyler, Mariah Carey, Brooke Shields, Angie Harmon, Kim Raver, Halle Berry, Mary-Kate and Ashley Olsen, Michelle Monaghan, and Tory Burch.

Awards 
Sevan Bıçakçı has received many distinguished awards such as:
 Town and Country Couture Award. (Six times in a row).
 Turkish Gold Design Award
 He was nominated for the Jameel Prize Award
 He was also nominated as the top five most noteworthy free lance jewelry designers by the Tanzanite Foundation.

References

External links 
 Official Website

1972 births
Living people
Businesspeople from Istanbul
Turkish jewellers
Ethnic Armenian businesspeople
Turkish people of Armenian descent